The Rural Municipality of Lomond No. 37 is a rural municipality (RM) in the Canadian province of Saskatchewan within Census Division No. 2 and  Division No. 1. Located in the southeast portion of the province, it is south of the City of Weyburn.

History 
The RM of Lomond No. 37 incorporated as a rural municipality on December 11, 1911.

Geography 
Long Creek, Roughbark Creek, and Jewell Creek all flow through the RM, eventually emptying into the Souris River.

Communities and localities 
The following urban municipalities are surrounded by the RM.

Villages
 Colgate
 Goodwater

The following unincorporated communities are within the RM.

Localities
 Maxim

Demographics 

Economy 
Its two principal industries are agriculture and petroleum production.

Government 
The RM of Lomond No. 37 is governed by an elected municipal council and an appointed administrator that meets on the first Thursday of every month. The reeve of the RM is Desmond McKenzie while its administrator is Aleshia Underwood. The RM's office is located in Weyburn.

Gallery 
A photo gallery of places in the RM of Lomond No. 37

References

External links 

Lomond

Division No. 2, Saskatchewan